MaerzMusik is a festival of the Berliner Festspiele and has been held annually since 2002 in March at the Haus der Berliner Festspiele and other venues. It is the successor festival to the Musik-Biennale Berlin and is considered one of the most important festivals for Neue Musik in Germany. The artistic director of MaerzMusik is Kamila Metwaly.

Musik-Biennale Berlin 
MaerzMusik is the successor festival to the Berlin Music Biennale. From 1991 to 2001, they were continued under the direction of Heike Hoffmann by the Berliner Festspiele. Many well-known composers premiered during the festival, including Günter Kochan, Georg Katzer, Ruth Zechlin, Friedrich Goldmann, Johannes Kalitzke and Siegfried Matthus.

MaerzMusik 
In March 2002, the festival took place for the first time for about ten days under the new name "MaerzMusik – Festival für aktuelle Musik" (MaerzMusik – Festival for Contemporary Music) and presented itself under the new artistic director Matthias Osterwold also with a new programmatic orientation. Alongside Neue Musik in its current developments as well as in works of historical significance, there was a new "presentation of experimental, conceptual, interdisciplinary and also media-artistic positions." The works of other disciplines such as the performing (music theatre, performance) or visual arts (sound art, installations) are included. Another focus was placed on non-European developments in music.

The programme ranged from established positions of Neue Musik such as John Cage, Karlheinz Stockhausen, Wolfgang Rihm or Sofia Gubaidulina to younger composers such as Beat Furrer and Enno Poppe and visual artists such as Rebecca Horn and musicians from the field of Electronica such as Ryoji Ikeda and Aphex Twin. The concept was very successful, with Maerzmusik 2014 attracting around 15,000 visitors.

In autumn 2014, the Austrian musicologist and free curator Berno Odo Polzer succeeded Matthias Osterwold as artistic director of the festival. He reconceived MaerzMusik as a "Festival for Time Issues" on positions about how we deal with time. Developed from the perspective of listening, the festival sees itself as a space in which "life, art and theory, experience and reflection can converge." Since 2022, Kamila Metwaly is part of the festival team and programmed its 2022 edition as leading curator together with Berno Odo Polzer.

On 1 September 2022, Kamila Metwaly took over the festival directorship. The curator and music journalist will take charge of the festival for the next two years and will work on the 2023 edition in collaboration with the composer and conductor Enno Poppe.

Venues 

Discography 
 2000: Musik-Biennale Berlin. Uraufführungen 1969–1995. (Red Seal)

References

Further reading 
 Manfred Vetter: Kammermusik in der DDR. Peter Lang, Frankfurt 1996, 
 Helga de la Motte-Haber: Rückblende: 10 Jahre MaerzMusik. Berliner Festspiele, Berlin 2011,

External links 
 

Classical music festivals in Germany
Festivals in Berlin